Football Club Déolois is a French association football club founded in 1968. They are based in the town of Déols and their home stadium is the Stade Municipal Jean Bizet. In 2020 the club secured promotion to National 3, the fifth tier of the French football league system. They suffered relegation back to the regional level in 2022.

References

External links
 

Football clubs in France
Association football clubs established in 1968
1968 establishments in France
Sport in Indre
Football clubs in Centre-Val de Loire